Pacific Oceania (abbreviated to POC) is the name given to the group of small nations of the Southern, Southwestern, Central and Western Pacific Ocean that compete collectively as one country in both the Davis Cup (men) and Billie Jean King Cup (women) tennis tournaments. Pacific Oceania is governed by the Oceania Tennis Federation.

As some Pacific Ocean countries and territories were too small or underdeveloped to have their own national teams, Pacific Oceania was established in the 1995, with both the men's and women's teams first participating in the 1995 editions of the Davis Cup and Fed Cup, respectively.

Nations and territories represented

Oceania Tennis Federation members never represented

See also
 Oceania
 Pacific Oceania Davis Cup team
 Pacific Oceania Fed Cup team
 Guam Fed Cup team
 Guam Davis Cup team
 Fiji Fed Cup team
 Fiji Davis Cup team
 International Tennis Federation

References

π
Sports clubs established in 1995
Sport in Papua New Guinea
Sport in Fiji
Sport in Samoa
Sport in Nauru
Sport in Tonga
Sport in Tuvalu
Sport in Tahiti
Sport in Kiribati
Tennis in the United States
Tennis in France
Tennis in Samoa
Tennis teams
Tennis in Oceania
Tennis in Fiji
Tennis in Guam
Tennis in Palau
Tennis in Papua New Guinea
Tennis in the Marshall Islands
Tennis in Nauru
Davis Cup Asia/Oceania Zone
1995 establishments in Oceania
Sport in Oceania